Conus swainsoni is a species of sea snail, a marine gastropod mollusk in the family Conidae, the cone snails and their allies.

Like all species within the genus Conus, these snails are predatory and venomous. They are capable of "stinging" humans, therefore live ones should be handled carefully or not at all.

Description
The size of the shell varies between 30 mm and 78 mm.

Distribution
This marine species occurs off New Caledonia.

References

 Tucker J.K. & Tenorio M.J. (2009) Systematic classification of Recent and fossil conoidean gastropods. Hackenheim: Conchbooks. 296 pp.
 Puillandre N., Duda T.F., Meyer C., Olivera B.M. & Bouchet P. (2015). One, four or 100 genera? A new classification of the cone snails. Journal of Molluscan Studies. 81: 1–23
 Estival, J.C. & Cosel, R. von, 1986 Conus swainsoni, a new Cone (Gastropoda: Conidae) from New Caledonia, vol. 45(n°2), p. 87-98

External links
 The Conus Biodiversity website
 Cone Shells – Knights of the Sea
 
 Holotype in MNHN, Paris

swainsoni
Gastropods described in 1986